The Lebanon conference was held on May 17–20, 1944, between representatives of the Greek government in exile, the pre-war Greek political parties, and the major Greek Resistance organizations, with the British ambassador Reginald Leeper in attendance. The conference occurred after an anti-monarchist mutiny among the Greek military the previous month. PM Georgios Papandreou's policy was to create a National Unity government ("National Contract") with the participation of the communist-dominated EAM. Finally there was a partial agreement, though tensions and disagreements remained.

Delegates
 Georgios Papandreou, Prime Minister of the Greek government in exile
  for the People's Party
  for the National People's Party
 Georgios Sakalis for the Progressive Party
  for the 
 Ioannis Sofianopoulos for the Union of the Left (Ένωση Αριστερών)
 Panagiotis Kanellopoulos for the National Unionist Party
  as independent
 , Communist Party of Greece (KKE)
 Stefanos Sarafis, ELAS, armed wing of EAM
 Komninos Pyromaglou, EDES, pro-Republican resistance organization, with Lieutenant-colonel S. Metaxas and Captain I. Metaxas
 Georgios Kartalis, EKKA, pro-Republican resistance organization
 Konstantinos Ventiris, general in the army of the Greek government in exile, with

Sources
 C.M. Woodhouse, Modern Greece, Faber and Faber, 1998 
 
 

Greece in World War II
Political history of Greece
1944 in Greece
1944 in Lebanon
May 1944 events
1944 conferences
Georgios Papandreou